Eagle Township is a township in Barber County, Kansas, USA.  As of the 2000 census, its population was 42.

Geography
According to the USGS, it contains one cemetery, Lodi.

The streams of East Cedar Creek, Pump Creek, Salt Fork Arkansas River, Salty Creek and West Cedar Creek run through this township.

References
 USGS Geographic Names Information System (GNIS)

External links
Lodi, Eagle Township, Barber County, Kansas
The Oak Creek Ranch History, photographs, geology, maps, wildlife and flowers of a ranch in Eagle Township, Barber County, Kansas.
 US-Counties.com
 City-Data.com

Townships in Barber County, Kansas
Townships in Kansas